Association Sportive Somasud is a Malagasy football club based in Toliara in the Ihorombe Region in south Madagascar.
In 1981 the team has won the THB Champions League.

Stadium
Currently the team plays at the 5000 capacity Stade Maître Kira.

Honours
THB Champions League
Champion (1): 1981

References

External links
Team profile - wildstat.com

Somasud